In the field of molecular biology, receptor tyrosine kinase-like orphan receptors (RORs) are a family of tyrosine kinase receptors that are important in regulating skeletal and neuronal development, cell migration and cell polarity. ROR proteins (ROR1 and ROR2 in humans) can modulate Wnt signaling by sequestering Wnt ligands.

References 

Tyrosine kinase receptors